Heinrich “Heinz” Haake (24 January 1892 – 17 September 1945) was a Nazi Party Gauleiter and government official.

Early life
The son of a city architect, he attended elementary school and grammar school, and after his education was complete, was employed as a bank clerk in Cologne. In 1914 when the First World War broke out, he joined the army as a one-year volunteer. He won the Iron Cross second class and was wounded four times, lastly in the battle of Langemarck in Belgium, after which he was classified as severely disabled. In 1919 after discharge from the military with the rank of Unteroffizier, he returned to Cologne. He became active in the Völkisch movement and joined the Deutschvölkischer Schutz- und Trutzbund. In 1922 he became a member of the Nazi Party. When it was temporarily banned in 1924, he switched to the National Socialist Freedom Movement and on 7 December 1924 became its only member in the Prussian Landtag.

Nazi career
When the Nazi Party was re-established in February 1925, Haake become the local leader of the party in Cologne.  Then, on 27 March 1925, he was appointed Gauleiter of Rhineland-South. He officially re-joined the Party on 14 April (membership number 13,328). However, he proved to be difficult to work with, and was often in conflict with his Gau Business Manager, Josef Grohé. On 1 June he was replaced as Gauleiter by his Deputy, Robert Ley. In July he was made Ortsgruppenleiter (Local Group Leader) in Cologne. In September 1925, he became a member of the National Socialist Working Association, a short-lived group of north and northwest German Gaue, organized and led by Gregor Strasser, which unsuccessfully sought to amend the Party program. It was dissolved in 1926 following the Bamberg Conference. From 1928 to 1932 he was a manager of the Nazi faction in the Landtag, becoming 3rd Vice-President of that body in 1932.

On 15 July 1932 Haake was appointed Landesinspekteur-West. In this position, he had oversight responsibility for the Gaue of Dusseldorf, Essen, Koblenz-Trier, Koln-Aachen & Saarland, and reported directly to Robert Ley.  This was a short-lived initiative by Gregor Strasser to centralize control over the Gaue. However, it was unpopular with the Gauleiters and was repealed on Strasser's fall from power in December 1932. At that time, Haake became leader of the Organization Department at the Brown House in Munich, again under Ley, who had succeeded Strasser as Reichsorganisationsleiter.
 
After the Nazi seizure of power, Haake was elected 1st Vice President of the Prussian Landtag in March 1933. On 5 March he was elected to the Reichstag for electoral constituency 20, (Cologne-Aachen). On 11 March he was appointed Landeshauptmann of Prussia’s Rhine Province and would remain in this position until May 1945.  In October 1933 he was named a member of the Academy for German Law. In 1934 he became a member of the Provincial Council of Rhine Province and also was appointed Reichsinspekteur in the Reichsleitung (Reich Leadership) of the Party. In June 1938 he was named an Honorary Senator of the University of Cologne. In February 1941, Haake attended a meeting with representatives of the Aktion T4 program, concerning the establishment of a euthanasia program for mentally institutionalized patients in Rhine Province. At first resistant, Haake relented when shown a Führer decree authorizing and ordering the implementation.
A member of the Sturmabteilung (SA), he attained the rank of SA-Brigadeführer in 1936, SA-Gruppenführer in 1938 and, on 24 January 1942, SA-Obergruppenführer.

At the end of the war in May 1945, he was arrested by the British. Interned in Recklinghausen, he was transferred from there to the prison hospital at Velen, where he died on 17 September.

References

Sources

External links
 
 

1892 births
1945 deaths
Gauleiters
German Army personnel of World War I
German people who died in prison custody
Members of the Academy for German LawOne Year Volunteer
Members of the Landtag of Prussia
Members of the Reichstag of Nazi Germany
National Socialist Freedom Movement politicians
National Socialist Working Association members
Nazi Party officials
Nazi Party politicians
Prisoners who died in British military detention
Recipients of the Iron Cross (1914), 2nd class
Sturmabteilung officers